The 1968–69 National Hurling League was the 38th season of the NHL, an annual hurling competition for the GAA county teams.

Division 1

Tipperary came into the season as defending champions of the 1967-68 season.

On 4 May 1969, Cork won the title after a 3-12 to 1-14 win over Wexford in the final. It was their 7th league title overall and their first since 1952-53.

In spite of finishing at the bottom of their respective groups, neither Galway of Laois were relegated as there was no promotion-relegation this season.

Wexford's Paul Lynch was the Division 1 top scorer with 8-24.

Division 1A table

Group stage

Division 1B table

Group stage

Knock-out stage
Semi-finals

Final

Scoring statistics
Top scorers overall

Top scorers in a single game

Division 2

Results

Knock-out stage

References

National Hurling League seasons
Lea
Lea